The Gates were a group of gates comprising a site-specific work of art by Bulgarian artist Christo Yavacheff and French artist Jeanne-Claude, known jointly as Christo and Jeanne-Claude. The artists installed 7,503 vinyl "gates" along  of pathways in Central Park in New York City. From each gate hung a panel of deep saffron-colored nylon fabric. The exhibit ran from February 12 through February 27, 2005.

In the books and other memorabilia distributed by the artists, the project is called The Gates, Central Park, New York, 1979–2005 in reference to the time that passed from the artists' initial proposal until they were able to go ahead with it.

The Gates were greeted with mixed reactions. Some people loved them for brightening the bleak winter landscape and encouraging late-night pedestrian traffic in Central Park; others hated them, accusing them of defacing the landscape. It was seen as an obstruction to bicyclists, who felt that the gates could cause accidents, although cycling was not legal on those paths. The artists received a great deal of their nationwide fame as a frequent object of ridicule by David Letterman, as well as by Keith Olbermann, whose apartment was nearby.

Fabrication

Construction and cost
According to the artists, the work used 5,390 tons of steel, 315,491 feet (96 km) of vinyl tubing, 99,155 square metres of fabric, and 15,000 sets of brackets and hardware. The textile was produced and sewn in Germany. The gates were assembled in a 25,000-square-foot (2,300 m²) Long Island facility, then trucked to Central Park.

As one of the conditions for use of the park space, the steel bases rested upon the walkways, but were unattached to them, so that no holes were drilled and no permanent changes were made to the park.

The artists sold pieces of their own artwork, including preparatory drawings for The Gates, to finance the project.

The artists said the project cost of $21 million. But Greg Allen and The New York Times attempted to itemize the costs and could account for about $5–10 million, given reasonable estimates for parts, labor, and costs related to the staffing of the installation.

Installation
Installation began on February 13, 2004. During the week of March 17, Central Park filled with workers using forklifts to move the rectangular steel plates into position. Small signs with alphanumeric codes along the park's walkways guided the placement of each piece.

By April 10, most of the rectangular metal plates were positioned. All had small orange plastic markers sticking up two feet (around half a meter) from each end, possibly intended to help people find the base plates if they were covered with snow. Progress was hampered in early 2005 by a major snowstorm on January 22 and extreme cold.

On February 7, 2005, more than 100 teams of eight workers, all wearing grey uniform smocks, began erecting the gates and bolting them to the base plates. The artists specified the color as saffron but many local observers described it as orange. The most common width seems to have been  although the width varied, depending on the width of the path, from 5 feet 6 inches to 18 feet.

Display

Opening

The project was officially launched on February 12, 2005, when then-New York Mayor Michael R. Bloomberg dropped the first piece of fabric at 8:30 a.m., with Christo and Jeanne-Claude in attendance. The rest of The Gates were opened subsequently throughout the park and were completed within the next few hours with large crowds of people watching. Generally, the crews of workers who erected the gates were assigned to open them. They walked underneath, and used a hook at the end of a long stick to pull a loop hanging from the crossbar of each gate. That opened the cloth bag containing the fabric panel part of the gate. The bag fell to the ground, along with a cardboard tube around which the fabric was rolled. The fabric part then hung from the horizontal crossbar. By the afternoon of February 12, all of the panels were unfurled.

The project staff remained deployed in the park, patrolling, and replacing damaged gates. On many days, staff members distributed free 2.75" square souvenir swatches of the orange fabric to passers by, in part intended to discourage vandalism. Nevertheless, one of the gates, near the Shakespeare Garden in front of the Delacorte Theatre, was vandalized and replaced frequently. The swatches remain highly collectible and trade on eBay for about $10 each.

Closure and legacy

The installation was set to close February 27, 2005. Christo and Jeanne-Claude also visited the installation on the last day, entering Central Park at its less congested northern end. Although the Park's roadways were closed to vehicles, they traveled with a police escort in their Maybach sedan. Christo then left the car and walked to several vantage points, capturing last minute photographs with a professional assistant. After the exhibition closed on February 27, the gates and bases were removed. The materials were industrially recycled, partially as scrap metal.

A 2007 documentary film's synopsis by the video's promoters, Kino Lorber, contend this artwork "brought over 4 million visitors from around the world to Central Park."

Albert Maysles's HBO movie The Gates, about the installation, aired February 26, 2008, won a Peabody Award that same year.

The science fiction movie Marjorie Prime features a fragmented memory from the female lead, Marjorie, about her experience of sitting on a park bench during this installation.

Inspirations
The Gates alludes to the tradition of Japanese torii gates, traditionally constructed at the entrance to Shinto shrines. Thousands of vermilion-colored torii line the paths of the Fushimi Inari shrine in Kyoto, Japan. Successful Japanese businessmen traditionally purchased a gate in gratitude to Inari, the god of worldly prosperity.

Gallery

References
Notes

Other sources
 Stephen Colbert describes The Gates
 Cave Paintings and Christo's Gates: Art in Individual Minds and Public Places
 Christo and Jeanne-Claude, The Gates: Central Park, New York City, 1979–2005, : for pictures of the manufacturing process, early meetings with city officials, pictures of the completed project, design drawings, etc.
 Christo and Jeanne-Claude, : for pictures and commentary about earlier projects.

External links

 The Gates on the Christo and Jeanne Claude website
  8-minute film for download: A Walk Through the Gates
 The Gates Photo Gallery
 In Pictures: The Gates – Extrageographic Magazine
 The Gates, Film by Albert Maysles, David Maysles, Antonio Ferrera, Matthew Prinzing, 2007, 87 min

2005 sculptures
Central Park
History of Manhattan
Installation art works
Public art in New York City
Vandalized works of art in New York City
Works by Christo and Jeanne-Claude